is a Japanese racing cyclist. She competed in the 2013 UCI women's road race in Florence. At the 2015 UCI Track Cycling World Championships she won a silver medal in the points race. She competed at the 2010 and 2014 Asian Games.

Major results
2015
1st Omnium, Japan Track Cup
3rd  Team Pursuit, Asian Track Championships (with Kanako Kase, Kisato Nakamura and Sakura Tsukagoshi)
2016
1st Points Race, Japan Track Cup
Asian Cycling Championships
2nd  Team Pursuit (with Yumi Kajihara, Kisato Nakamura and Sakura Tsukagoshi)
3rd  Points Race

References

External links

1991 births
Living people
Japanese female cyclists
Place of birth missing (living people)
Cyclists at the 2010 Asian Games
Cyclists at the 2014 Asian Games
Universiade medalists in cycling
Universiade bronze medalists for Japan
Asian Games competitors for Japan
Medalists at the 2011 Summer Universiade
20th-century Japanese women
21st-century Japanese women